The surname Marais (Marsh in French) may refer to:

"Marais" from France:

 Jean Marais (1913–1998), a French actor
 Joseph Marais (presumably deceased), a French Olympic fencer
 Marin Marais (1656–1728), a French Baroque music composer
 Matthieu Marais (1664–1737), a French jurist and writer
 Paul Godet des Marais (1647–1709), a French Bishop of Chartres
 Roland Marais (c. 1685 – c. 1750), a French Baroque composer

"Marais" from the UK:
 Richard Marais, an oncologist
 
"Marais" from the United States:

 Anthony Marais (born 1966), an American writer

"Marais" from South Africa:

 Erik Marais (living), a South African politician
 Eugène Marais (1871–1936), a South African lawyer, naturalist, poet and writer
 Hannes Marais (born 1941), a South African international rugby union player and captain
 Jaap Marais (1923–2000), an Afrikaner nationalist and the leader of the far-right South African political party, the Herstigte Nasionale Party
 Jan S. Marais (1919-2009), South African banker and politician
 Jean Marais (born 1992), South African cricketer
 Jessica Marais (born 1985), a South African-born Australian actress
 Josef Marais (1905–1978), a South African singer
 Kobus Marais (living), a South African politician
 Lejeanne Marais (born 1989), a South African figure skater
 Nic Marais (born 1980), a South African radio personality
 Peter Marais (born 1948), a South African politician
 SP Marais (born 1989), a South African rugby union player
 Stephanus Le Roux Marais (1896–1979), a South African composer
 Wessel Marais (1929–2013), a South African botanist
 Willie Marais (1928–2007), an Afrikaner nationalist and the leader of the Herstigte Nasionale Party

See also
 Marais (disambiguation)
 Sarie Marais

Surnames of French origin
French-language surnames
Afrikaans-language surnames